Christian Møller Pedersen (27 October 1889 – 22 March 1953) was a Danish gymnast who competed in the 1920 Summer Olympics. He was part of the Danish team, which won the gold medal in the gymnastics men's team, free system event in 1920.

References

External links
 

1889 births
1953 deaths
Danish male artistic gymnasts
Gymnasts at the 1920 Summer Olympics
Olympic gymnasts of Denmark
Olympic gold medalists for Denmark
Olympic medalists in gymnastics
Medalists at the 1920 Summer Olympics